Burscheid is a town in the Rheinisch-Bergischer district, in North Rhine-Westphalia, Germany. The town is known for its sub-communities (somewhat equivalent to the American concept of neighborhoods) and the town centre with its marketplace and churches.

Economy
The two largest employers in Burscheid are Federal Mogul GmbH (formerly known as Goetze AG) and Johnson Controls.

Government
The current mayor is Stefan Caplan (CDU), first elected in 2014 and re-elected in September 2020.

The current city council was elected with the following breakdown of political affiliations, as of the 2020 local election:

 CDU: 14 seats
 Bündnis für Burscheid: 8 seats
 SPD: 7 seats
 Grüne: 7 seats
 FDP: 2 seats
 UWG: 2 seats

Transportation
Burscheid is on the A1 Autobahn, and federal highway (Bundesstraße) 51 travels through the town. The Verkehrsverbund Rhein-Sieg and Verkehrsverbund Rhein-Ruhr both operate bus lines that stop in Burscheid.

Neighboring communities
Burscheid is within 15 kilometers of both Solingen and Leverkusen.

Sub-communities
Bellinghausen - Benninhausen - Berghamberg - Berringhausen - Blasberg - Dierath - Dünweg - Dürscheid - Großbruch - Großhamberg - Grünscheid - Heddinghofen - Hilgen - Kaltenherberg - Kämersheide - Kippekofen - Kleinhamberg - Kuckenberg - Lungstraße - Nagelsbaum - Oberlandscheid - Oberwietsche - Ösinghausen- Repinghofen - Rötzinghofen - Sträßchen.

Hilgen (or Burscheid-Hilgen) is the second largest and most significant sub-community, next to the main town center (Burscheid itself). Hilgen is on the town's border with Wermelskirchen and has many of its own shops and restaurants. Most sub-communities in Burscheid are easily reachable by foot or bicycle.

Services
Burscheid has its own public schools, swimming pool and volunteer fire department.

Tourist sites
 Haus Landscheid is a former estate that belonged to the knight Heinrich von Nesselrode in 1731. It was the site of a restaurant from 1983 to 1998, but was abandoned from 1998 until recently. It is now a hotel and restaurant (updated Oct 2014).
 The Lambertsmühle (Lamberts Mill) is in the Wiehbach valley in the southwest of the town, and has been a museum since 1994. The mill's main exhibit is entitled "The Path from Grain to Bread."
 The Paffenlöher Steffi (in the neighboring community of Paffenlöh) is a local dance club.

Personalities

Honorary citizen 
 Paul Luchtenberg (1890-1973), co-founder of the FDP, Member of Bundestag, minister of culture of the state of North Rhine-Westphalia.
 Wilhelm Schmidt, mayor of the town of Burscheid from 1894 to 1928
 Hugo Bernd, powder-wheeler 
 Erich Richartz-Bertrams, (died 1973), industrialist and patron
 Ewald Sträßer (Burscheid, 1867 - Stuttgart, 1933), compositor

Sons and daughters of the city 

 Carl Pulfrich (1858-1927), physicist and optician
 Günter Wallraff (b. 1942), writer and undercover journalist

Other personalities 

 Rüdiger Vollborn, (b. 1963), former Bundesliga goalkeeper of the neighboring football club Bayer 04 Leverkusen
 Karlheinz Stockhausen composer, (1928-2007), visited once the Burscheider Bürgerschule. 
 Uwe Boll, (b. 1965), German director, producer and screenwriter
 Silke Gnad, (b. 1966), former national handball player
 Hansi Gnad, (b. 1963), former national basketball player

References

External links

 Official site 

Districts of the Rhine Province